Royal Tailor was an American Christian pop rock band. The group disbanded in 2015.

History
Royal Tailor was started by Tauren Wells, DJ Cox, Jeremy Guzman, and Blake Hubbard while they were attending Indiana Bible College in 2004. Jarrod Ingram, who attended Gateway College of Evangelism (now Urshan College), joined later.

After hearing Royal Tailor's music, Leeland and Jack Mooring passed along the band's EP to Jason McArthur, Vice President of A&R of Provident Music Group, who signed them to a record deal. Producers Aaron Lindsey, Chuck Butler and Daniel Kinner produced their debut album, Black & White, which was released on June 7, 2011. It received a nomination for Best Contemporary Christian Music Album for the 54th Grammy Awards.

In 2013, they released their self-titled album that included "Ready Set Go" (featuring Capital Kings) as its single. The album made it to No. 95 on the Billboard 200, No. 3 US Christian Albums, and No. 17 US Independent Album.

The group disbanded in 2015 when Wells started his solo career. The other members of the band have moved-on to new projects. In 2016, Wells said of the decision to disband Royal Tailor that "The band was successful, by our measures of success. It was doing well, still growing. I felt like we had just put out our best album. Things were great, relationally, and obviously we're best friends. But to be honest, we were so tired." Wells released his first solo single ("Undefeated") in May 2016, an EP (Undefeated) in September 2016, and has done other projects.

Members 

 Tauren Wells – lead vocals (2004–2015)
 DJ Cox – guitar, backing vocals (2004–2015)
 Blake Hubbard – bass guitar, backing vocals (2004–2015)
 Jarrod Ingram – drums (2009–2015)
 Travis Rigney – drums (2004–2008)
 Jeremy Guzman – keyboards (2004–2008)

Discography

Studio albums

EPs

Guest appearances

Awards
Grammy Awards

GMA Dove Awards

References

External links
 

American pop rock music groups
American Christian musical groups
Musical groups from Indiana
Essential Records (Christian) artists